Tetragonoderus chilensis is a species of beetle in the family Carabidae. It was described by Pierre François Marie Auguste Dejean in 1831.

References

chilensis
Beetles described in 1831